The 1940 Swedish Ice Hockey Championship was the 18th season of the Swedish Ice Hockey Championship, the national championship of Sweden. IK Gota won the championship.

Tournament

Qualification 
 IF Verdandi - Västerås SK 4:3
 IK Westmannia - VIK Västerås HK 3:4
 IFK Västerås - IFK Mariefred 0:7
 Surahammars IF - IF Aros 3:3/1:2
 Djurgårdens IF - Rålambshofs IF 1:2
 IFK Lidingö - Skuru IK 3:2
 IFK Stockholm - Thule IF 4:3
 Liljanshof - Westermalms IF 4:0
 IFK Nyland - GIF Sundsvall 7:0

First round 
 Reymersholms IK - Älsvsjö AIK 6:0
 IK Sirius - Stockholms IF 1:8
 IFK Lidingö - Liljanshofs IF 0:5
 IFK Norrköping - IK Hermes 1:3
 Södertälje IF - Rålambshofs IF 5:2
 IK Sleipner - Tranebergs IF 2:4
 IF Vesta - IFK Stockholm 2:1
 IF Aros - VIK Västerås HK 4:0
 IFK Nyland - UoIF Matteuspojkarna 1:3
 IF Verdandi - Nacka SK 1:7
 IFK Mariefred - IK Sture 3:2

Round of 16
 IK Aros - AIK 0:8
 Södertälje SK - IK Hermes 1:2
 Karlbergs BK - Reymersholms IK 4:0
 Nacka SK - UoIF Matteuspojkarna 2:4
 Hammarby IF - Liljanshofs IF 3:0
 Stockholms IF - IFK Mariefred 2:5
 Södertälje IF - Tranebergs IF 2:0
 IF Vesta - IK Göta 0:3

Quarterfinals 
 AIK - IK Hermes 5:2
 Karlbergs BK - UoIF Matteuspojkarna 3:1
 Hammarby IF - IFK Mariefred 7:0
 Södertälje IF - IK Göta 1:3

Semifinals 
 AIK - Karlbergs BK 2:0
 Hammarby IF - IK Göta 1:2

Final 
 AIK - IK Göta 1:4

External links
 Season on hockeyarchives.info

Cham
Swedish Ice Hockey Championship seasons